Mykola Makarovych Marchak (5 January 1904 – 23 September 1938) was a Ukrainian and Soviet politician, who was the acting Chairman of the Council of People's Commissars of the Ukrainian SSR (today's equivalent of prime-minister) from October 1937 to February 1938.

He was a son of a peasant and was a member of the Russian Communist Party (b) from 1921.

On 20 June 1938, Marchak was arrested and accused of belonging to an anti-Soviet Trotskyist organization. On 23 September 1938, Marchak was found guilty by the Military Collegium of the Supreme Court of the USSR and was sentenced to death. Marchak was rehabilitated by the resolution of the Military Collegium of the Supreme Court of the USSR of 17 June 1958.

Biography
Mykola Marchak was born in a peasant family in a small village in Khmelnytskyi Oblast, western Ukraine.

References

1904 births
1938 deaths
People from Khmelnytskyi Oblast
People from Kamenets-Podolsky Uyezd
Ukrainian people in the Russian Empire
Bolsheviks
First convocation members of the Soviet of Nationalities
Communist Party of Ukraine (Soviet Union) politicians
Chairpersons of the Council of Ministers of Ukraine
Executed Soviet people from Ukraine
Ukrainian people executed by the Soviet Union
Soviet rehabilitations
Great Purge victims from Ukraine